Eumeces schneiderii, commonly known as Schneider's skink or the Berber skink, is a species of lizard in the family Scincidae. The species is endemic to Central Asia, Western Asia, and North Africa. There are five recognized subspecies.

Etymology
Both the specific name, schneiderii, and one of the common names, Schneider's skink, are in honor of German zoologist Johann Gottlob Theaenus Schneider.

The subspecific name, barani, is in honor of Turkish herpetologist İbrahim Baran.

The subspecific name, zarudnyi, is in honor of Russian zoologist Nikolai Zarudny.

Description
E. schneiderii has the following characters: Head moderate; snout short, obtuse. Nasal rather large, usually divided, in contact with the two anterior upper labials; no postnasal; 5 supraoculars, the three anterior in contact with the frontal; parietals entirely separated by the interparietal; 4 or 5 pairs of nuchals; ear-opening rather large, with 4 or 5 long pointed lobules anteriorly; 2 azygos postmentals. 22 to 28 scales round the middle of the body, perfectly smooth, the laterals smallest, those of the two median dorsal series very broad and larger than the ventrals. The length of the hind limb is contained 2.5 to 3 times in the length from snout to vent. When pressed against the body, the limbs just meet or fail to meet. A series of transversely enlarged subcaudals.

Olive-grey or brownish above, uniform or with irregular golden-yellow spots or longitudinal streaks; a yellowish lateral streak, extending from below the eye to the hind limb, is constant; lower surfaces yellowish white.
  
Size: from snout to vent, 16.5 cm (6.5 inches); plus tail, 20 cm (8 inches).

Subspecies
Five subspecies are recognized as being valid, including the nominotypical subspecies.

Eumeces schneiderii barani Kumlutas et al., 2007
Eumeces schneiderii pavimentatus (I. Geoffroy Saint-Hilaire, 1827)
Eumeces schneiderii princeps (Eichwald, 1839)
Eumeces schneiderii schneiderii (Daudin, 1802)
Eumeces schneiderii zarudnyi Nikolsky, 1900

Nota bene: A trinomial authority in parentheses indicates that the subspecies was originally described in a genus other than Eumeces.

Geographic distribution
E. schneiderii is found in Eastern Algeria, Tunisia, Libya, Egypt, Israel, Cyprus, Turkey, western Syria, Lebanon, Jordan, Iran (Kavir desert), Iraq, Saudi Arabia, Transcaucasia, Russia (Dagestan), Turkmenistan, Uzbekistan, Tajikistan, eastern Georgia, southern Armenia, Azerbaijan, Asia Minor, Afghanistan, northern Pakistan, northwestern India.

Subspecies E. s. barani: Turkey (Anatolia).
Subspecies E. s. pavimentatus: Jordan, Lebanon, Syria
Subspecies E. s. princeps: Armenia, Azerbaijan, Caucasus
Subspecies E. s. zarudnyi: southeastern Iranian Plateau in Kerman Province and Sistan and Baluchestan Province, Iran; Helmand Basin and southern desert regions of Afghanistan; Baluchistan and Mekran Coast of Pakistan. Type locality: Bazman, Iran (restricted by Taylor, 1935).

Habitat

Reproduction
E. schneiderii is oviparous.

References

Further reading
Caputo V, Odierna G, Aprea G, Capriglione T (1993). "Eumeces algeriensis – a full species of the Eumeces schneiderii group (Scincidae) – karyological and morphological evidence". Amphibia-Reptilia 14 (2): 187-193.
Göçmen, Bayram; Senol, Asaf; Mermer, Ahmet (2002). "A new record of Schneider's Skink, Eumeces schneideri  Daudin, 1802 (Sauria: Scincidae) from Cyprus". Zoology of the Middle East 27: 19-22.
Daudin FM (1802). Histoire Naturelle, Générale et Particulière des Reptiles; Ouvrage faisant suite à l'Histoire Naturelle gènèrale et particulière, composée par Leclerc de Buffon; et rédigée par C.S. Sonnini, membre de plusieurs sociétés savantes. Tome quatrième [Volume 4]. Paris: F. Dufart. 397 pp. ("Scincus Schneiderii [sic]", new species, p. 291).
Griffith H, Ngo A, Murphy RW (2000). "A cladistic evaluation of the cosmopolitan genus Eumeces Wiegmann (Reptilia, Squamata, Scincidae)". Russian Journal of Herpetology 7 (1): 1-16.
Mertens R (1920). "Über die geographischen Formen von Eumeces schneideri Daudin". Senckenbergiana 2 (6): 176-179. (in German).
Mertens R (1924). "Dritte Mitteilung über die Rassen der Glattechse Eumeces schneiderii". Senckenbergiana 27: 53-62. (1946?) (in German).
Mertens R (1924). "Herpetologische Mitteilungen: V. Zweiter Beitrag zur Kenntnis der geographischen Formen von Eumeces schneiderii Daudin". Senckenbergiana 6: 182-184. (in German).
Smith MA (1935). The Fauna of British India, Including Ceylon and Burma. Reptilia and Amphibia. Vol. II.—Sauria. London: Secretary of State for India in Council. (Taylor and Francis, printers). xiii + 440 pp. + Plate I + 2 maps. (Eumeces schneideri, pp. 341–342).
Taylor EH (1936) [1935]. "A taxonomic study of the cosmopolitan lizards of the genus Eumeces with an account of the distribution and relationship of its species". University of Kansas Science Bulletin 23 (14): 1-643.

External links
 https://web.archive.org/web/20020828163352/http://itgmv1.fzk.de/www/itg/uetz/herp/photos/Novoeumeces_schneiderii.jpg
Eumeces schneideri at The Checklist of Armenia's Amphibians and Reptiles at Tadevosyan's Herpetological Resources. Accessed 30 March 2007.
Picture of Eumeces schneideri
Picture of Eumeces algeriensis
Captive care

Eumeces
Reptiles of Afghanistan
Reptiles of Armenia
Reptiles of Azerbaijan
Reptiles of Pakistan
Reptiles of Central Asia
Taxa named by François Marie Daudin
Reptiles described in 1802
Reptiles of Russia